Men's Slalom World Cup 1985/1986

Final point standings

In Men's Slalom World Cup 1985/86 the best 5 results count.

External links
FIS-ski.com - World Cup standings - Slalom 1986

World Cup
FIS Alpine Ski World Cup slalom men's discipline titles